The Lindenwood Lady Lions women represented Lindenwood University in CHA women's ice hockey during the 2019-20 NCAA Division I women's ice hockey season. The Lady Lions welcomed a new head coach, Shelley Looney, and new members of the coaching staff, notably alumnus goaltender Nicole Hensley. Both Looney and Hensley are Olympic gold medalists. The team also moved to a new facility, the Centene Community Ice Center, in St. Louis suburb Maryland Heights. Inexperience and injuries led to a disappointing start to Looney's tenure.

Offseason

Former star Kendra Broad signed a contract to play with the Connecticut Whale of the NWHL.

Recruiting

Standings

Roster

2019–20 Lady Lions

Schedule

|-
!colspan=12 style=" "| Regular Season

|-
!colspan=12 style=" "|CHA Tournament

References

Lindenwood
Lindenwood Lions women's ice hockey seasons
Lindenwood
Lindenwood